Yong'an is a county-level city in west-central Fujian province, People's Republic of China. It is located on the Sha River, which is a tributary of the Min River. Formerly a county, Yong'an became a county-level city on September 12, 1984.

The city's population is 319,000 (2003–2004).The natural population growth rate is 5.87%. The city was the capital of the Fujian Provincial Government during the Second Sino-Japanese War from 1938 to 1945.

Yong'an is known for:
Its rich natural resources (hence the saying "gold mountain silver water"). The forest coverage is more than 85%, which is a miracle percentage in southern-east of China.  
A relatively strong industrial base. Yong'an is a rising industrial city in Fujian Province and an important energy and raw materials production base.
A relatively complete infrastructure located in the northwest of Fujian Minnan. It is an important transport hub and a distribution center.
A relatively high level of urbanization, actively creating better urban residences.

Climate
Yong'an, similar to the rest of the province, has a humid subtropical climate (Köppen Cfa), with short and mild winters, and long, very hot and humid summers. With monthly percent possible sunshine ranging from 23% in March to 55% in July, the city receives 1,629 hours of bright sunshine annually, with summer being the sunniest time of the year; spring and late winter are especially overcast and damp.

Administrative divisions
Subdistricts:
Yandong Subdistrict, Yanxi Subdistrict, Yannan Subdistrict, Yanbei Subdistrict

Towns:
Xiyang, Gongchuan, Ansha, Xiaotao, Dahu, Caoyuan, Hongtian

Townships:
Huainan Township, Shangping Township, Luofang Township, Qingshui She Ethnic Township

References

Cities in Fujian
County-level divisions of Fujian
Sanming